The 2019 Indian general election in Meghalaya for two Lok Sabha seats was held in a single phase on 11 April 2019.

Results

Party wise

Constituency wise

Assembly segments wise lead of Parties

References

Indian general elections in Meghalaya
2010s in Meghalaya
Meghalaya